Ankita Raina and Emily Webley-Smith were the defending champions, but both players chose not to participate.

Lesley Kerkhove and Lidziya Marozava won the title, defeating Lyudmyla and Nadiia Kichenok 6–4, 6–2 in the final.

Seeds

Draw

References 
 Draw

Zhuhai Open - Doubles
Zhuhai Open